Arshak Vramian (Arshag Vramian, born Onnik Derdzakian; 1871 – 4 April 1915) was an Armenian revolutionary and a leading member of the Armenian Revolutionary Federation; he was a member of the party's Central Committee. He was a leading member during Armenian congress at Erzurum. He was a member of the Ottoman parliament elected from Van Province.  He was killed just before the Siege of Van.

Notes

1871 births
1915 deaths
Armenian revolutionaries
Armenians from the Ottoman Empire